The 1920 Kildare County Council election was held on Friday, 4 June 1920.

Results by party

Results by electoral area

Athy

Kildare

Naas

Newbridge

References 

1920 Irish local elections
1920